In British politics, parliamentary select committees can be appointed from the House of Commons, like the Foreign Affairs Select Committee; from the House of Lords, like the Delegated Powers and Regulatory Reform Committee; or as a joint committee of Parliament drawn from both, such as the Joint Committee on Human Rights. Committees may exist as "sessional" committees – i.e. be near-permanent – or as "ad-hoc" committees with a specific deadline by which to complete their work, after which they cease to exist, such as the Lords Committee on Public Service and Demographic Change.

The Commons select committees are generally responsible for overseeing the work of government departments and agencies, whereas those of the Lords look at general issues, such as the constitution, considered by the Constitution Committee, or the economy, considered by the Economic Affairs Committee. Both houses have their own committees to review drafts of European Union directives: the European Union Committee in the House of Lords, and the European Scrutiny Committee in the House of Commons.

The Intelligence and Security Committee is not a select committee, though it contains members from both houses and has a chair elected by the House of Commons. It is a unique committee of parliamentarians nominated by the Prime Minister and reporting to him or her, not Parliament.

The Backbench Business Committee was created in 2010 as a non-ministerial committee to cover non-government business, following recommendations from the Reform the House of Commons report under the Wright Committee. 

Other changes occurring as a result of recommendations by the Wright Committee included limiting the number of members per committee to 11, requiring those members and chairs to be appointed to their positions by the House, and a reduction in the number of committees.

History

Specialised committees of investigation had existed within Parliament since the Tudor period and the system of committees was further developed during the mid-1960s by Richard Crossman as Leader of the House of Commons.

In the United Kingdom, the modern system of departmental select committees came into being in 1979, following the recommendations of a Procedure Select Committee, set up in 1976, which reported in 1978. It recommended the appointment of a series of select committees covering all the main departments of state, with wide terms of reference, and with power to appoint specialist advisers as the committees deemed appropriate. It also suggested that committee members should be selected independently of the party whips, as chosen by the Select Committee of Selection. The fourteen new committees began working effectively in 1980 after the 1979 general election.

In the House of Commons 
The post-1979 system is made up of three main types of committee. Departmental committees shadow each of the main government departments – for example the Education Select Committee shadows the Department for Education. A number of committees work on general themes which are not the responsibility of any single department – for example, the Science and Technology Select Committee, and Women and Equalities Select Committee. Another group of committees deal with the internal affairs of the House (for example, the Procedure Select Committee and Standards and Privileges Select Committee).

Rarely, there are also select committees of the Commons (and sometimes joint standing committees) that are tasked with the detailed analysis of individual bills.  Most bills are referred, since the 2006–07 session, to public bill committees, and before that, there were standing committees.

The chairs of (the majority of) select committees have been elected by the house as a whole since June 2010: before that the members were appointed by their parties and chairs voted on solely by those members.

The chairs of committees are allocated to political parties on the basis of their numerical strength in the House of Commons. Negotiations between party managers determine which party will hold which committee chair. By convention, the Public Accounts Committee is chaired by a member of the main opposition party, while the Treasury Select Committee is chaired by a member of the governing party. The remaining places on the committee are allocated in proportion to the numerical strength of the parties in the House of Commons. These positions are filled by votes conducted within party caucuses. This means that positions on select committees are only ever contested among members of the same party. The standard number of members on a departmental committee is 11, although some committees such as Public Accounts have a larger membership.

In July 2005, the Administration Select Committee was instituted, replacing the five 'domestic' committees which had been responsible for the consideration of services provided for the House in the Palace of Westminster from 1991 to 2005. It deals with issues as diverse as catering services, the House of Commons Library, digital services provision, and visitor services.

The powers of Select Committees in the Commons are governed by the Standing Orders. The powers of departmental select committees are set out in standing order 152 as follows:

In the House of Lords 

The House of Lords has a set of five major select committees:

 The European Union Committee, which currently has six sub-committees
 The Constitution Committee
 The Economic Affairs Committee
 The Science and Technology Committee (House of Lords)
 The Communications and Digital Committee

These committees run inquiries into topics within their remit, issuing reports from time to time. The European Union Committee also scrutinises EU legislation and other EU proposals, as well as conducting inquiries.

Non-parliamentary

Some English local authorities also have a select committee system, as part of their Overview and Scrutiny arrangements.

Rules regarding their work

The Osmotherly Rules set out guidance on how civil servants should respond to parliamentary select committees.

See also 
Parliamentary committees of the United Kingdom
Estimate Audit Committees

References

External links
 Committees UK Parliament 
 Select Committee of the Legislative Council of Hong Kong
 Democracywiki Unlock Democracy